Zinc finger protein 577 is a protein that in humans is encoded by the ZNF577 gene.

References

Further reading 

Human proteins